José Durán Noguera (born 8 July 1951) is a Spanish former swimmer who competed in the 1968 Summer Olympics.

Notes

References

External links
 
 
 
 

1951 births
Living people
Spanish male breaststroke swimmers
Olympic swimmers of Spain
Swimmers at the 1968 Summer Olympics
Mediterranean Games medalists in swimming
Mediterranean Games gold medalists for Spain
Mediterranean Games silver medalists for Spain
Swimmers at the 1967 Mediterranean Games